Shadows of Conscience is a 1921 American silent Western film directed by John P. McCarthy and starring Russell Simpson, Barbara Tennant and Gertrude Olmstead.

Cast
 Russell Simpson as Jim Logan
 Landers Stevens as Wade Curry
 Barbara Tennant as Alice
 Bradley Ward as Pedro (the halfbreed)
 Nelson McDowell as Wesley Coburn
 Edward Cooper as Judson Craft
 Ida Mae McKenzie as Winnie Coburn
 Fred Burns as Sheriff Bowers
 Gertrude Olmstead as Winifred Coburn

References

Bibliography
 Connelly, Robert B. The Silents: Silent Feature Films, 1910-36, Volume 40, Issue 2. December Press, 1998.
 Munden, Kenneth White. The American Film Institute Catalog of Motion Pictures Produced in the United States, Part 1. University of California Press, 1997.

External links
 

1921 films
1921 Western (genre) films
American silent feature films
Silent American Western (genre) films
1920s English-language films
Films directed by John P. McCarthy
American black-and-white films
1920s American films